Rákóczi tér is a station on Line 4 of the Budapest Metro. It is located beneath the eponymous square, named after Francis II Rákóczi. The station was opened on 28 March 2014 as part of the inaugural section of the line, from Keleti pályaudvar to Kelenföld vasútállomás.

The station was decorated red, white and green (the colours of the Hungarian flag) and designed with the names of the former domains of Francis II Rákóczi.

Connections
Tram: 4, 6

References

External links
Official web page of the construction
Construction of Rákóczi tér metro station

M4 (Budapest Metro) stations
Railway stations opened in 2014
2014 establishments in Hungary